The Elsa oil field is an oil field located in the Adriatic Sea. It was discovered in 1992 and developed by Orca Exploration. It began production in 1992 and produces oil.

References

Oil fields in Italy